Agua Caliente is a municipality in the Chalatenango department of El Salvador.

Agua Caliente, El Salvador is a town north of Chalatenango, the capital city of the department of Chalatenango, North East of Nueva Concepcion. It occupies an area of 195 square kilometers, and has a population (2006) of 8,992. The location of the city center is 14°11′12.91″N, 89°13′19.82″W. As per the Technical Secretary of the Presidency of El Salvador, it has the 27th ranking of extreme poverty of the 267 municipalities of El Salvador.

History

Most people from the neighboring "cantones" or hamlets display Caucasian features; they may be blond, with fair skin and blue eyes. This may be because the entire department of Chalatenango was populated by early Spanish settlers attracted by the boom of indigo cultivation in colonial times and sent there by Baron of Carardalet, governor of Guatemala in the late 18th century. A pdf document published by FISDL  indicates that "As per Antonio Gutierrez y Ulloa in 1807 Agua Caliente was simply a hacienda of cattle and indigo belonging to Bernardino Aguilar, five leagues N. E. of Tejutla, away from the Royal Road. As per other traditions, that hacienda became a hamlet in 1819 and then, fulfilling the Laws and Orders of Indias it became a village with the long name of San Jose Agua Caliente de las Flores. The new municipality was incorporated to the Region of Tejutla. From 1824 to 1833 it belonged to the department of San Salvador; to the department of Tejutla in 1833; to the department of San Salvador from 1833 to 1835; to the department of Cuzcatlan from 1835 to 1855. From then on it has been a municipality of Chalatenango. In 1890 it had 2,340 souls. Its name comes from two hot springs in the area and another one in the canton of Obrajuelo."

The Cabrera, Guevara, Menjivar and Aguilar families were prominent in the history of the town. Abraham Cabrera donated the land occupied by the high school of the town. He was mayor of the town sometime in the early 1900s. His two sons, Jose Angel Cabrera and Miguel Cabrera also served as mayors between 1960 and 1975. In late July 2007, Agua Caliente began receiving running water again. Electricity and running water were first installed in the early 1960s as part of the initiatives of the Alliance for Progress of President John F. Kennedy. As most towns in El Salvador, there is no water treatment for raw sewage and this is typically discharged in a nearby creek or in the Metayate River which runs in the middle of the town.

Socio-economics status

The local cemetery appears overflowing but there is no expansion expected in the near future. It is mainly a livestock community. A local cooperative assists with loans to small enterprises. Cheese and dairy products which are produced locally can be purchased at good prices in a couple of stores. In downtown Agua Caliente there is a Catholic church, recently under restoration, and a mini park. The church is a beautiful colonial church and it appears more majestic than those in neighboring municipalities. Legend has it that the massive bell in one of the towers is just a replica of the original one which was stolen overnight and then taken by thieves to a famous church in Ahuachapan sometime in the 20th century. Every Thursday morning from about eight to eleven there is a market place in the streets. This is when the majority of people from neighboring hamlets or “cantones” buy their food and clothing items and may come down to sell cattle or farm products. There is a vibrant environment in the area. Hundreds of people emigrated to as far as Australia and Europe in the 80's as the town was the scene of conflicts between the leftist guerrillas and the government troops. As these emigrants started to buy land in Agua Caliente, land prices soared. It is not unusual to find houses priced at $50,000.00, something which was unheard of twenty five years ago. Some local families depend on money they receive from expatriates, relatives living in the United States. The warm water lagoon gives the location its name “Agua Caliente” (Hot water or Hot Springs). The Metayate River divides the town in two main “barrios” or districts: El Carmen and El Centro. The flow of water of the river has diminished considerably over time due to deforestation of the surrounding hills. One of these hills has a huge rock (“La Piedra Movediza” or “The Moving Rock”) that can be moved with little effort due to its natural balance . The festivities of the town take place in the week of March 18 and 19; they are dedicated to Saint Joseph, patron saint of Agua Caliente.

Agua Caliente immigrants in the USA

Nantucket, a wealthy island resort in Massachusetts is the home to a large population of immigrants from Agua Caliente. An article that appeared in The Inquirer and Mirror, a Nantucket's newspaper in July 2011, estimated that there are almost 1000 people from Agua Caliente living in the island. It is now estimated that there are 8540 living on the island as a hidden sanctuary.

The article ( portrays a dynamic community of painters, landscapers, teachers, janitors, as well as business-owners and property-owners while not pursuing legal immigration status. 

There are many people from Agua Caliente now living in the United States, Canada, and Australia.

References

Municipalities of the Chalatenango Department